The Republic of China Air Force Thunder Tiger Aerobatics Team was founded in 1953 and is under the jurisdiction of the Republic of China Air Force.

History

The Republic of China Air Force Thunder Tiger Aerobatics Team was established at Tainan Air Force Base in 1953. At the time of its founding, most Thunder Tiger pilots lived in Tainan's  military compound. Since 1993, the group has been based at the Republic of China Air Force Academy in Gangshan, Kaohsiung. In the past, the team has flown a wide array of aircraft, including the F-84G Thunderjet, and F-86F Sabre, as well as light fighters in the Northrop F-5 family. They now fly the AT-3 developed by the Taiwan-based Aerospace Industrial Development Corporation in air shows. To honor the Republic of China centenary in 2011, the Thunder Tigers participated in the largest flypast held in Taiwan. In October 2014, Lieutenant Colonel Chuang Pei-yuan was involved in a fatal crash while flying an AT-3 owned by the Thunder Tigers on a routine training mission. Team activities were suspended shortly after all AT-3 aircraft were grounded for inspection. The Thunder Tigers flew at Chuang's funeral in November 2014, but did not perform at unofficial public events until November 2016.

See also
 United States Air Force Thunderbirds
 Blue Angels – United States Navy
 Russian Knights – Russian Air Force
 Red Arrows – Royal Air Force

References

1953 establishments in Taiwan
Aerobatic teams
Republic of China Air Force
Military units and formations established in 1953